Kartar Singh (born 1953) is an Indian wrestler.

Kartar Singh may also refer to:

People
 Kartar Singh Jhabbar (1874–1962), India Sikh religious leader
 Kartar Singh Sarabha (1896–1915), Indian revolutionary
 Kartar Singh Komal (1913-1992), Indian gyani
 Kartar Singh Duggal (1917–2012), Indian writer in Punjabi, Hindi, Urdu and English
 Kartar Singh Thind (1917-1991), Indian botanist
 Kartar Singh Bhadana (born 1955), Indian politician
 Kartar Singh Tanwar (born 1962), Indian politician

Films
Kartar Singh (film), a 1959 Pakistani film